Rhodometrini is a tribe of the geometer moth family (Geometridae) described by Ramón Agenjo Cecilia in 1952. It has about sixteen species in two genera and one genus with a single species tentatively associated with the tribe.

Genera
Casilda Agenjo, 1952
Rhodometra Meyrick, 1892

Uncertain association
Ochodontia Lederer, 1853

References